Catawba is an unincorporated community in Caldwell County, in the U.S. state of Missouri.

History
Catawba was laid out in 1884, and named for a grove of catalpa trees near the original town site. A post office called Catawba was established in 1872, and remained in operation until 1905.

References

Unincorporated communities in Caldwell County, Missouri
1872 establishments in Missouri
Unincorporated communities in Missouri